Protamandua is an extinct genus of anteaters.  Its closest living relatives are the giant anteater (Myrmecophaga tridactyla) and tamanduas (genus Tamandua). Fossils of Protamandua are restricted to the Santa Cruz Formation of Argentina. It may have been a common ancestor of Myrmecophaga and Tamandua.

References

Anteaters
Prehistoric placental genera
Miocene xenarthrans
Miocene mammals of South America
Mayoan
Laventan
Colloncuran
Friasian
Santacrucian
Neogene Argentina
Fossils of Argentina
Fossil taxa described in 1904
Taxa named by Florentino Ameghino